Sterling "Ruffin" Maddox (May 23, 1941 – March 24, 2020) was an American civil engineer and politician who served as a member of the Maryland House of Delegates for Montgomery County's 1st District from 1970 to 1974.

Early life and career 
Maddox grew up in Potomac, Maryland. He attended the Landon School and Lehigh University. He traveled to Vietnam as a civilian engineer for the U.S. military. After returning, he graduated from George Washington University with a Bachelor of Science.

Later life and death 
After his time in office he became a developer, helping to establish neighborhoods in the region. He then served as a real estate agent for Washington Fine Properties for nearly 15 years. Maddox lived in Bethesda, Maryland, and Kent Island, Maryland before he moved into a assisted living facility in Arlington, Virginia.

Maddox died from complications of COVID-19 at age 78; at the time of his death he was suffering from Parkinson's disease and dementia. He was among the thousand people mentioned in the New York Times article U.S. Deaths Near 100,000, An Incalculable Loss. He was survived by his two daughters.

References 

1941 births
2020 deaths
George Washington University alumni
20th-century American politicians
Democratic Party members of the Maryland House of Delegates
People from Bethesda, Maryland
Deaths from the COVID-19 pandemic in Virginia
Democratic Party (United States) politicians